Buddha Air Pvt. Ltd is an airline based in Jawalakhel, Lalitpur, Nepal, near Patan. It operates domestic as well as international services within Nepal and India, serving mainly large towns and cities in Nepal. It operates 33 routes to 14 destinations in Nepal and to Varanasi, India. Its main base is Tribhuvan International Airport, Kathmandu. It was the largest domestic carrier in terms of passengers carried in 2020.

History

The airline was established on 23 April 1996 as a Private Limited Company by Surendra Bahadur Basnet, a retired Supreme Court judge and former government minister; and his son Birendra Bahadur Basnet. The name of the airline is derived from the Sanskrit word 'Buddha', a title used for the much revered Siddhartha Gautama. Operations commenced on 11 October 1997 with a sightseeing flight to Mount Everest using a brand new Beechcraft 1900D. In 2001, the airline partnered with the Bhutanese flag carrier Drukair by whom an aircraft was chartered. Within ten years the company had expanded to a fleet of seven 1900Ds. In 2008 a loan from the International Finance Corporation allowed the company to expand further by purchasing two ATR 42 aircraft. Buddha Air took delivery of its first 70-seat ATR 72-212 in June 2010.

In 2020, Buddha Air announced first plans to enter the rural aviation market in Nepal by serving smaller STOL-airfields by Fall 2021. This subsidiary called Yashodhara Air was set up in January 2021 with the aim of operating by 2022.

International operations
Buddha Air became the first international airline to operate charters to Paro Airport in Bhutan in August 2010.

In 2011, Buddha Air began international flights from Pokhara Airport to Chaudhary Charan Singh International Airport in Lucknow, India, however these flights were discontinued soon after. The airline also announced plans to fly to New Delhi's Indira Gandhi International Airport in the future. Internationally, Varanasi Airport is also seasonally served from Tribhuvan International Airport.

Destinations

Buddha Air flies to the following destinations as of November 2020.

Buddha Air also operates scheduled mountain sightseeing flights from Kathmandu to Mount Everest range and from Pokhara to the Annapurna Massif. The flights usually depart in the early morning hours and return to the respective airports one hour later.

Fleet

Current fleet
Buddha Air's fleet consists of the following aircraft (as of March 2022). The airline has planned to add 3 Airbus A320 aircraft by 2022.

Former fleet

Hangar 
Buddha Air is the first airline in Nepal, and one of few in South Asia, to have a closed-door hangar facility. Built at a cost of US$2.5 million at the Tribhuvan International Airport, Buddha Air also provides aircraft maintenance facilities to other airlines, including the Bangladeshi airline Novoair which sends its ATR aircraft for maintenance at the hangar.

Buddha Air is constructing a hangar that will be able to accommodate aircraft up to the size of an Airbus A319 at Pokhara International Airport.

Accidents and incidents
 On 11 November 2003, a scheduled Buddha Air flight from Kathmandu en route to Biratnagar mistakenly landed in Bhairahawa Airport, owing to the air traffic and a subsequent slip-up in communication in Kathmandu.
 On 25 September 2011, Buddha Air Flight 103 crashed while attempting to land at Tribhuvan International Airport after a sightseeing flight of the Mount Everest region. All 19 passengers and crew on board the Beechcraft 1900D died. Out of the 19 passengers, 10 were Indian nationals, 2 were US nationals, 1 Japanese and 6 were Nepalese. The crew of 3 were also Nepalese.
 On 18 December 2020, Buddha Air Flight 505, which took off from Tribhuvan International Airport en route to Janakpur Airport landed in Pokhara Airport. According to the airline, there was a mixup due to lapses in communication and failure to follow detailed standard operating procedures.
 On 16 December 2021, Buddha Air Flight 360, 9N-AEE which took off from Bharatpur Airport to Tribhuvan International Airport with 19 passengers and 3 crew on board made an emergency landing at Bharatpur Airport when its left engine failed. Passengers were transferred to another flight and flown to Kathmandu.

Trivia
In 2015, Buddha Air became the shirt sponsor of Biratnagar based football club Morang XI, who played in Nepal's highest football league, the Nepal National League.

References

External links

Airlines banned in the European Union
Airlines of Nepal
Airlines established in 1996
Lalitpur District, Nepal
1996 establishments in Nepal